The Arnold Clark Cup is an invitational women's association football tournament hosted by The Football Association in England, starting in 2022. It is named after car retailer Arnold Clark, who signed a multi-year sponsorship deal. ITV acts as the competition's domestic broadcast partner.

Played during the February/March international break, the Arnold Clark Cup takes place at the same time as other notable international women's invitational tournaments such as the Algarve Cup, the Cup of Nations, the Cyprus Women's Cup, the Istria Cup, the Pinatar Cup, the SheBelieves Cup, the Tournoi de France, the Turkish Women's Cup and the Women's Revelations Cup.

Format
The four invited teams play each other once in a round-robin tournament. Points awarded in the group stage follow the formula of three points for a win, one point for a draw, and zero points for a loss. A tie in points would be decided by goal difference.

Results

Participating nations

References

External links
 Official website

 
International association football competitions in Europe
International women's association football competitions hosted by England
Recurring sporting events established in 2022
International women's association football invitational tournaments
2022 establishments in England
February sporting events